The Fort Wayne Daisies were a women's professional baseball team based in Fort Wayne, Indiana that played from  through  as members of the All-American Girls Professional Baseball League.

History
The Daisies represented Fort Wayne, Indiana, and their home games were played at North Side High School (1945–1946) and Memorial Park (1946–1954).

Daisy uniforms often changed from one season to the next, away uniforms having been yellow, pink, and brown during various years.  Early Daisy uniforms featured a circular emblem of the Fort Wayne city seal in the center of the chest.  This was replaced in later years with a patch reading "DAISIES".  In the final years of the league, the Daisy uniform changed to a center seam running down the middle of the dress with an F and W on the front.

The team debuted in the 1945 season, replacing the departed Minneapolis Millerettes. The Daisies went 62–47 in their debut and finished four and a half games behind the first place Rockford Peaches.

Even though the Daisies made it to the playoffs in every year from 1948 to 1954, ending in first place from 1951 through 1954, they failed to win a championship title.

Among its notable players were the sisters Betty Foss and Joanne Weaver, who were able to win the final five batting championships of the league and two Player of the Year awards. With Helen Callaghan leading all hitters in 1945, the Daisies amassed six batting crowns to set a league record.

Other players of note included pitchers Jaynne Bittner, Maxine Kline and Dorothy Wiltse Collins; catchers Rita Briggs and Lavonne Paire; shortstop Dorothy Schroeder, center fielder Faye Dancer, and sluggers Wilma Briggs and Jean Geissinger.

All-time players roster
Bold denotes members of the inaugural roster

Velma Abbott
Evelyn Adams
Melba Alspaugh
Isabel Alvarez
Lavone Anson
Lenna Arnold
Phyllis Baker
Lois Barker
Kathryn Beare
Lottie Beck
Jaynne Bittner
Alice Blaski
Kay Blumetta
Phyllis Bookout
Rita Briggs
Wilma Briggs
Carol Brown
Delores Brumfield
Shirley Burkovich
Patricia Burton
Helen Callaghan
Margaret Callaghan
Georgia Campbell
Jean Campbell
Virginia Carver
Betty Carveth
Donna Cook
Dorothy Cook
Shirley Crites
Sarah Mavis Dabbs
Faye Dancer
Alice DeCambra
Lillian DeCambra
Mildred Deegan
Audrey Deemer
Thelma Eisen
Lillian Faralla
Meryle Fitzgerald
Betty Foss
Barbara Gates
Jean Geissinger
Beulah Anne Georges
Betty Gernert
Audrey Haine
Elise Harney
Jean Havlish
Ruby Heafner
Joyce Hill
Nancy Hodgin
Alice Hoover 
Catherine Horstman
Lillian Jackson
Alice Janowski
Frances Janssen
Arleene Johnson
Marilyn Jones
Daisy Junor
Vivian Kellogg
Beatrice Kemmerer
Helen Ketola
Maxine Kline
Theresa Kobuszewski
Phyllis Koehn
Irene Kotowicz
Dorothy Kovalchick
Ruth Kramer
Marie Kruckel
Noella Leduc
Annabelle Lee
Rhoda Leonard
Ruth Lessing
Alta Little
Betty Luna
Helene Machado
Betty McKenna
Marie Mahoney
Kathleen Malach
Mirtha Marrero
Doris Marsh
Ruth Matlack
Mildred Meacham
Naomi Meier
Norma Metrolis
Eleanor Moore
Mary Moraty
Nancy Mudge
Mary Nelson
Donna Norris
Penny O'Brian
Lavonne Paire
June Peppas
Betty Petryna
Marjorie Pieper
Bertha Podolski
Marie Richardson
Georgiana Rios
Mary Rountree
Patricia Roy
Irene Ruhnke
Toni Sachetti
Ellen Schallern
Dorothy Schroeder
Pat Scott
Jean Smith
Adele Stahley
Lee Surkowski
Mary Taylor
Norma Taylor
Yolande Teillet
Doris Tetzlaff
Helen Thomas
Mava Lee Thomas
Alice Tognatti
Betty Trezza
Betty Tucker
Dolly Vanderlip
Kathryn Vonderau
Helen Walulik
Nancy Warren
Evelyn Wawryshyn
Jean Weaver
Joanne Weaver
Mary Weddle
Marie Wegman
Shirley Weierman
Margaret Wenzell
Betty Whiting
Ruth Williams
Dorothy Wiltse
Elsie Wingrove
Trois Wood
Lois Youngen
Agnes Zurowski

Managers

See also
History of sports in Fort Wayne, Indiana

Sources
All-American Girls Professional Baseball League History
All-American Girls Professional Baseball League official website – Fort Wayne Daisies seasons
All-American Girls Professional Baseball League official website – Manager/Player profile search results
AAGPBL Collectors
AAGPBL Everything
The Diamond Angle – AAGPBL Players Interviews
Golden Age Era Sports
All-American Girls Professional Baseball League Record Book – W. C. Madden. Publisher: McFarland & Company, 2000. Format: Hardcover, 294pp. Language: English. 
The Women of the All-American Girls Professional Baseball League: A Biographical Dictionary – W. C. Madden. Publisher:  McFarland & Company, 2005. Format: Softcover, 295 pp. Language: English. 

All-American Girls Professional Baseball League teams
1945 establishments in Indiana
1954 disestablishments in Indiana
Baseball teams established in 1945
Baseball teams disestablished in 1954
Professional baseball teams in Indiana
Sports in Fort Wayne, Indiana
Defunct baseball teams in Indiana
Women's sports in Indiana